David Andrew Melillo (born June 12, 1988) is the former lead guitarist for Anarbor, and the former bassist for pop rock band Cute Is What We Aim For. His earlier material as a solo artist consisted of acoustic guitar-driven acoustic rock and piano-accented power pop, somewhat in the vein of early Dashboard Confessional and The Rocket Summer.

Biography
David Melillo was born on June 12, 1988 in Glen Ridge, New Jersey to David A. Melillo Sr. and Gina A. Melillo. After moving to Celebration, Florida in December 2000, he learned how to play the guitar, the bass guitar and the piano and eventually began writing songs. While attending Celebration High School, he played in several ensembles, including the short-lived garage band Trexx.

In mid-2004, Melillo formed the Taking Back Sunday-inspired indie rock band Arcana. While their submitted two-song demo fell on deaf ears with Drive-Thru Records, Melillo's solo material did not. Drive-Thru Records invited Melillo to play a showcase for the label and signed him immediately in December 2004, at the age of sixteen. Melillo made his debut on the Drive-Thru Records and PureVolume compilation album Bands You Love, Have Heard of, and Should Know (2005) with his song "Wait for It". Melillo spent the following summer recording with producer James Wisner in St. Cloud, FL. Melillo's debut EP, titled Talk Is Cheap, was first released on April 17, 2006 as a free digital download from mtvU. The physical CD release was issued on June 13 through Drive-Thru Records, containing one extra track.

After a falling out with Drive Thru Records, Melillo joined Cute Is What We Aim For playing rhythm guitar on the 2007 Warped Tour. He toured with the band for the following 2 years on bass guitar and helped write/record the band's sophomore album "Rotation" alongside John Feldmann. In 2009, Melillo left the band for personal reasons, and formed a new band, Nocturnal Me, with former members of Cute Is What We Aim For. Nocturnal Me released three EPs: "Self Titled" in 2009, "Too" in 2010 and "Two Faced" in 2011.

In 2010 Melillo shared production credits on several independent releases, most notably Leslie Mosier's debut EP/album and Set It Off's EP which preluded the band's signing with Equal Vision Records. Melillo also began working as a pop/r&b songwriter in 2010 for several major labels and artists, with a focus on melody/lyrics.

2011 began with Melillo refocusing his efforts on his own music. He released a 4-song EP "Future Focused" in October to be followed by a 13-track mix-tape titled "Thinking Of You" in November.

Discography

EPs
Talk Is Cheap (2006)
Future Focused (2011)

Albums
You've Got Potential (2022)

Non-album tracks
"Wait for It" – released on Bands You Love, Have Heard of, and Should Know (2005)
"It Ain't Me Babe" – released on Listen to Bob Dylan: A Tribute (2005)
"All I Want for Christmas" – released on A Santa Cause 2: It's a Punk Rock Christmas (2006)
"The Ties that Bind" released on Demo (2008)
"Read Between The lines" released on Demo (2008)

Dave Melillo's touring band
Dave Melillo – vocals, acoustic guitar
Clark Spurlock – lead guitar
Matt Mendes - Bass
Nate Mullins - Drums

References

External links
Official website
Dave Melillo's profile at MySpace
Nocturnal Me's profile at MySpace

1988 births
Living people
People from Glen Ridge, New Jersey
Singer-songwriters from New Jersey
American male singer-songwriters
American rock singers
American rock songwriters
Drive-Thru Records artists
21st-century American singers
21st-century American male singers